Benkt Austrin (16 May 1909 – 3 May 1974) was a Swedish sports shooter. He competed in the 100 metre running deer event at the 1956 Summer Olympics.

References

External links
 

1909 births
1974 deaths
Swedish male sport shooters
Olympic shooters of Sweden
Shooters at the 1956 Summer Olympics
Sportspeople from Karlstad